Life with Lucy is an American sitcom starring Lucille Ball that aired for one season on ABC from September 20 to November 15, 1986. It is the only Lucille Ball sitcom to not air on CBS and the very last sitcom she starred in before her death in 1989. Only 8 out of the 13 episodes produced were aired before ABC cancelled the series. Unlike Ball's previous sitcoms, Life with Lucy was a failure in the ratings and poorly received by critics and viewers alike.

Premise
Ball plays a widowed grandmother who has inherited her husband's half interest in a hardware store in South Pasadena, California, the other half being owned by his business partner, widower Curtis McGibbon (played by Gale Gordon). Lucy's character insists on "helping" in the store, even though when her husband was alive, she had taken no part in the business and hence knows nothing about it. The unlikely partners are also in-laws, her daughter being married to his son, and all of them, along with their young grandchildren, live together.

Creative control and production
During the 1984–1985 television season, NBC had experienced a huge success with its Bill Cosby comeback vehicle The Cosby Show, following it up the next year with The Golden Girls, which likewise revitalized the careers of Bea Arthur and Betty White. ABC, looking to stage a similar resurgence for an older sitcom star and to boost Saturday night ratings, approached 75-year-old, five-time Emmy award winner and cultural icon Lucille Ball. Producer Aaron Spelling had been in talks with Ball and her second husband Gary Morton since 1979 about possibly doing another series; the popular success of her dramatic turn in the television film Stone Pillow had proved she was still popular with audiences. Ball was initially hesitant about returning to television, stating that she did not believe she could top the 25-year run of success she had had with I Love Lucy, The Lucy Show and Here's Lucy, especially without Vivian Vance, who was deceased. She eventually agreed, conceding she had missed having a regular project to work on daily, on the condition of having total creative control.

ABC offered Ball the writers from the critical and ratings hit  M*A*S*H, but Ball insisted on hiring her longtime writers Bob Carroll Jr. and Madelyn Pugh (credited as Madelyn Davis). Both had worked for Ball since her 1948 radio show My Favorite Husband and had written over 500 television and radio episodes for Ball, plus the occasional TV special and feature film. Ball also called in crew members who had worked for her since the days of I Love Lucy. The most notable was sound man Cam McCulloch, who joined the crew during I Love Lucy’s third season in 1954. By 1986, however, McCulloch was 77 years old and quite hard of hearing (he was still working actively in Hollywood at the time, mixing audio for WKRP in Cincinnati, Square Pegs and select episodes of Newhart). Ball also insisted on hiring her former co-star Gale Gordon, who by that time was retired from acting and living in Palm Springs. Gordon had worked with Ball on Jack Haley's radio show and more consistently on My Favorite Husband. He was the first choice for the character of Fred Mertz and had guest starred on I Love Lucy and The Lucy–Desi Comedy Hour before becoming a main cast member on The Lucy Show in its second season and acting on all six seasons of Here's Lucy.

Gordon agreed to do the show with the promise of a full season's pay for all 22 episodes regardless of whether the show was picked up. According to cast and crew members, the then 80-year-old Gordon never once flubbed a line on the set during the 13-episode duration. Ball was reportedly paid $100,000 an episode. Ball’s husband Gary Morton, carrying the title of executive producer, negotiated for $150,000 per episode. The pilot was created and shot, all without network interference or even test screenings. ABC and producers believed Life with Lucy would be a critical and ratings success that would run for many years, just as Ball's previous shows had been.

Ball's character's surname, Barker, continued her tradition of using surnames containing the letters "ar" (as in Ricardo, Carmichael and Carter on Ball's previous sitcoms) in tribute to her ex-husband Desi Arnaz.

The show's theme song was performed by Eydie Gormé. Apparently, an alternative theme was written by Ball's daughter, Lucie Arnaz, with Cy Coleman.

Ratings and cancellation

Fourteen episodes were written, thirteen filmed, but only eight aired. On the day of the last filmed (but unaired) episode, producer Aaron Spelling learned of the show's cancellation by ABC; he decided to tell Ball's husband Gary Morton, who decided not to reveal the news to her until after filming ended. The last episode to be aired, "Mother of the Bride", featured Audrey Meadows, who was offered to be cast as a regular to give the show a new direction and Ball's character a comic foil and partner, similar to the role of Vivian Vance in Ball's previous series. (This was the only Ball sitcom in which Vance, who had died in 1979, never appeared.) Meadows turned down the offer.

Life with Lucys premiere episode on September 20 made the Nielsen's Top 25 (#23 for the week) for its week; however, subsequent episodes dropped steadily in viewership; Life with Lucy went against NBC's The Facts of Life in the same Saturday night lead off timeslot and never gained ground against it. It ranked only 73rd out of 79 shows for the season (the seventh lowest rated show on TV for the season), with a 9.0/16 rating/share. Since only 13 episodes were produced, it was not possible for the series to go into heavy rerun rotation like I Love Lucy. Nevertheless, it aired on Nick at Nite as part of a Lucille Ball-theme marathon in 1996. Episodes can also be found at the Paley Center for Media in New York City and Beverly Hills, California. Biographies of the actress reveal that she was reportedly devastated by the show's failure, and she never again attempted another series or feature film; her subsequent interviews and other TV appearances were infrequent. Ball's last public appearance was as a presenter at the 1989 Academy Awards, where she and fellow presenter Bob Hope were given a standing ovation. She died a month later, in April 1989. In a 1999 interview with the Archive of American Television, Aaron Spelling attributed the failure of the show to his decision to allow Ball to do the same type of shows she had done in the past. Spelling said that at her age the audience were more worried for her safety than laughing at her pratfalls. He took the blame for allowing her full creative control, because he said Ball had offered to do something different if he thought that was best, but he felt her ideas were more likely to succeed. Spelling said this experience had a lot to do with his rarely producing sitcoms.

In July 2002 TV Guide named Life with Lucy the 26th worst TV series of all time, stating that it was "without a doubt, the saddest entry in [its] list of bad TV shows of all time". In his book What Were They Thinking? The 100 Dumbest Events in Television History, author David Hofstede ranked the series at No. 21 on the list.

Cast

Main
Lucille Ball as Lucille "Lucy" Barker
Gale Gordon as Curtis McGibbon
Ann Dusenberry as Margot "Margo" Barker McGibbon
Larry Anderson as Theodore "Ted" McGibbon
Jenny Lewis as Rebecca "Becky" McGibbon
Philip J. Amelio II as Kevin McGibbon
Donovan Scott as Leonard Stoner

Recurring
Kellie Martin as Patty
Brandon Call as Max
Tom Williams as various voice overs

Guest stars
Life with Lucy had two special guest stars, John Ritter ("Lucy Makes a Hit with John Ritter") as himself and Audrey Meadows ("Mother of the Bride") as Lucy's sister Audrey.

Episodes

Home media
In September 2018, Time-Life released a DVD, Lucy: The Ultimate Collection, that included 4 episodes of Life with Lucy (which had never before been released to home media), as well as 32 episodes of I Love Lucy, 2 episodes of The Lucy-Desi Comedy Hour, 24 episodes of The Lucy Show, and 14 episodes of Here's Lucy, plus a wide variety of bonus features.

On July 26, 2019, CBS/Paramount announced the release of all thirteen episodes on a separate Life with Lucy - The Complete Series DVD set, including the final five episodes that were produced but never aired. The set was released on October 8, 2019.

In Australia, Life With Lucy - The Complete Series was released on April 1, 2020 and distributed by Shock Entertainment.

References

External links

 Life With Lucy: The Lucy Shows

1986 American television series debuts
1986 American television series endings
1980s American sitcoms
American Broadcasting Company original programming
English-language television shows
Television shows set in Pasadena, California
Television series by CBS Studios
Television series by Spelling Television